The 2013–14 FC Bayern Munich season was the 115th season in the club's history and the 49th consecutive season in the top flight of German football, the Bundesliga, since their promotion from the Regionalliga Süd in 1965. Bayern participated in this season's editions of the DFB-Pokal, DFL-Supercup, UEFA Champions League, UEFA Super Cup, and FIFA Club World Cup.

Pep Guardiola became the new head coach. Bayern signed Jan Kirchhoff, Mario Götze and Thiago. Mitchell Weiser returned from his loan spell. Anatoliy Tymoshchuk, Maximilian Riedmüller, Dale Jennings, Mario Gómez, Luiz Gustavo and Emre Can left Bayern. Nils Petersen made his loan spell permanent. Pre-season started on 26 June.

Bayern kicked off their Bundesliga on 9 August against Borussia Mönchengladbach with a 3–1 win and finished on 10 May with a 1–0 win against VfB Stuttgart. Bayern defeated Schwarz-Weiß Rehden 5–0 in the first round of DFB-Pokal. Bayern entered into Champions League in the Group Stage. They defeated CSKA Moscow 3–0 in their opening fixture in the competition on 17 September. They went to the FIFA Club World Cup in December claiming the title of Club World Champion after wins against Guangzhou Evergrande and Raja Casablanca. Bayern were also in the DFL-Supercup and UEFA Super Cup. They lost to Borussia Dortmund in the DFL-Supercup and defeated Chelsea in a shoot–out in the UEFA Super Cup, making 2013 the most successful year in club history by number of tournaments won (five).

Background

Background information
Jan Kirchhoff, Mario Götze, and Thiago transferred to Bayern Munich and Mitchell Weiser returned to Bayern after finishing his loan with 1. FC Kaiserslautern. Jan Kirchhoff, Mario Götze, and Mitchell Weiser officially joined Bayern when the transfer window opened on 1 July. Thiago joined Bayern on 14 July. Nils Petersen, Anatoliy Tymoshchuk, Maximilian Riedmüller, Dale Jennings, Mario Gómez, Emre Can, and Luiz Gustavo all left the club. Nils Petersen made his loan spell permanent. He was on loan to Werder Bremen. Tymoshchuk's contract expired. Riedmüller was released. Dale Jennings, Mario Gómez, Emre Can, and Luiz Gustavo were all sold. Dale Jennings didn't make any first team appearances for Bayern. Pep Guardiola was hired as new head coach of Bayern, signing on 16 January 2013, and he took over on 26 June. Guardiola's contract runs until 30 June 2016. He kept Hermann Gerland as assistant coach, and Domenec Torrent was brought in as an assistant coach. Lorenzo Buenaventura was appointed as a fitness trainer, and Lars Kornetka was appointed to do game and video analysis and research reports. Peter Hermann left Bayern and became an assistant coach at Schalke 04. Bayern made two failed bids for Robert Lewandowski. Pre–season started on 26 June.

Transfers and contracts

In

Out

Contracts

Bundesliga

Review

August

Bayern faced Borussia Mönchengladbach on 9 August in the first round of play in the Bundesliga. Bayern won 3–1. Arjen Robben, Mario Mandžukić and David Alaba scored for Bayern. Dante scored an own goal to put Borussia Mönchengladbach on the board. The first matchday finished with Bayern tied with Bayer Leverkusen for third place in the league table. Bayern faced Eintracht Frankfurt on matchday two on 17 August. Bayern won 1–0 from a Mario Mandžukić goal. Thiago made his Bundesliga debut. After the second matchday was completed, Bayern were again tied with Bayer Leverkusen and had moved up to second place in the table. Bayern's matchday three opponent was 1. FC Nürnberg on 24 August. Nürnberg used "massive defending" tactics in the match. Josip Drmić and Daniel Ginczek were the main attacking players for Nürnberg. Bayern ended up getting goals from Franck Ribéry and Arjen Robben in the second half, and the result was a 2–0 victory. Despite the win, Bayern dropped to third place. Thiago picked up an injury during the match. On matchday four, Bayern faced SC Freiburg, which ended in a 1–1 draw. Xherdan Shaqiri gave Bayern a 1–0 in the 33rd minute. Nicolas Höfler scored in the 86th minute to equalize for Freiburg. Bayern moved up to second place. Bastian Schweinsteiger sprained his ankle in the match.

September

The next match was matchday 5 against Hannover 96 on 14 September, which Bayern won 2–0. Mario Mandžukić and Franck Ribéry scored for Bayern. Schweinsteiger made a "brief comeback" against CSKA Moscow. Schweinsteiger ended up starting the match on 21 September and was substituted in the 78th minute. Bayern defeated Schalke 04 4–0 on matchday six with goals from Schweinsteiger, Mario Mandžukić, Franck Ribéry, and Claudio Pizarro. Pep Guardiola considered this match "our best Bundesliga performance of the season so far." After the match and with Borussia Dortmund's 1–1 draw against 1. FC Nürnberg, Bayern and Borussia Dortmund were equal with 16 points each, but Bayern remained second due to an inferior tiebreaking situation. Bayern faced VfL Wolfsburg on matchday seven on 28 September. and won 1–0 with a goal from Thomas Müller. Bayern ended September in second place in the Bundesliga table

October

Bayern faced Bayer Leverkusen on matchday eight on 5 October. The match ended in a 1–1 draw. Toni Kroos scored for Bayern Munich and Sidney Sam scored for Bayer Leverkusen. Bayern Munich finished the matchday in first place. Bayern faced 1. FSV Mainz 05 on 19 October. Bayern won 4–1. Arjen Robben, Thomas Müller, and Mario Mandžukić scored for Bayern. Thomas Müller scored two goals. Shawn Parker scored for Mainz. Bayern finished the matchday in first place. Bayern faced Hertha BSC on 26 October. Bayern won 3–2. Mario Mandžukić and Mario Götze scored for Bayern. Mario Mandžukić scored two goals. Adrián Ramos and Änis Ben-Hatira scored for Hertha BSC. Bayern finished the matchday in first place.

November–December
Bayern faced 1899 Hoffenheim on 2 November. Bayern won 2–1. Mario Mandžukić and Thomas Müller scored for Bayern and Niklas Süle scored for Hoffenheim. The win meant that Bayern equaled Hamburger SV's 30-year-old record of 36 consecutive matches without a loss. Bayern finished the matchday in first place. Bayern faced FC Augsburg on 9 November. Bayern won 3–0 with goals from Jérôme Boateng, Franck Ribéry, and Thomas Müller. With this win, Bayern are undefeated in 39 consecutive league matches. Bayern ended the matchday in first place. Bayern faced Borussia Dortmund on 23 November. Franck Ribéry was ruled out of the match. Bayern won 3–0 with goals from Mario Götze, Arjen Robben, and Thomas Müller. Bayern finished the matchday in first place. Bayern finished November against Eintracht Braunschweig on 30 November. Bayern won 2–0 with two goals from Arjen Robben. Bayern finished the matchday in first place. Bayern faced Werder Bremen on 7 December. Bayern won 7–0 with goals from Assani Lukimya-Mulongoti (own goal), Daniel Van Buyten, Franck Ribéry (2 goals), Mario Mandžukić, Thomas Müller, and Mario Götze. Bayern finished the matchday in first place.

January–February

Bayern started the second half of the season with matchday 18 on 24 January against Borussia Mönchengladbach. Bayern were without Bastian Schweinsteiger for the match. There were issues with Franck Ribéry, Javi Martínez, Arjen Robben, and Philipp Lahm. Franck Ribéry had pain in the legs and Javi Martínez didn't practice the few days leading up to the match and Pep Guardiola "had already had little hope" of participating in the match and didn't get into the matchday squad. Arjen Robben was still not completely over his injury, however, he isn't likely to start the match. Arjen Robben didn't start the match and came into the match in the 79th minute. Philipp Lahm had a knee irritation but was likely to play in the match and he started the match. Mario Mandžukić was not in the matchday squad due to poor performances in training. Bayern won the match 2–0 with goals from Mario Götze and Thomas Müller. Bayern finished the matchday in first place. Bayern played VfB Stuttgart on matchday 17 on 29 January;  after the last match in matchday 17. The match was rearranged because of Bayern's participation in the 2013 FIFA Club World Cup. Mario Mandžukić was back in the squad; but wasn't in the starting line–up. Bayern won the match 2–1. Claudio Pizarro and Thiago scored for Bayern and Vedad Ibišević scored for Stuttgart. Vedad Ibišević gave Stuttgart a 1–0 in the 29th minute. Bayern were trailing in the 76th minute when Claudio Pizzaro equalized. Thiago scored in stoppage time to win the match. Bayern are now 13 points clear of second place and, with the win, has a 43–match undefeated streak. Bayern finished January in first place. Bayern faced Eintracht Frankfurt on matchday 19 on 2 February. Bayern won 5–0 with goals from Mario Götze, Franck Ribéry, Arjen Robben, Dante, and Mario Mandžukić. David Alaba was substituted off for the first time this season in the 75th minute. Thiago's 185 touches of the ball is a new league record. Bayern finished the matchday in first place. Bayern faced 1. FC Nürnberg on matchday 20 on 8 February. Bayern won 2–0 with goals from Mario Mandžukić and Philipp Lahm. This was Lahm's first goal in over three years for Bayern. Bayern finished the matchday in first place and are 13 points ahead of second place Bayer Leverkusen. Bayern faced SC Freiburg on matchday 21 on 15 February. Bayern won 4–0 with goals from Dante, Xherdan Shaqiri (2 goals), and Claudio Pizarro. Xherdan Shaqiri picked up an injury in the match. Bayern finished the matchday in first place. Bayern faced Hannover 96 on matchday 22 on 23 February. Bayern won 4–0 with goals from Thomas Müller (2 goals), Thiago, and Mario Mandžukić. The win was Bayern's 14th consecutive win and 47th consecutive match undefeated. Thomas Müller picked up a hamstring injury against Hannover and was out for five days before he could jog again. Bayern finished the matchday in first place and are 19 points ahead of Bayer Leverkusen.

March

Bayern faced Schalke 04 on matchday 23 on 1 March. Bayern won 5–1. Bayern scored four goals in the first 28 minutes. David Alaba, Arjen Robben (3 goals), and Mario Mandžukić scored for Bayern. Rafinha scored an own goal for Schalke. Schalke were sent down to ten men after Kyriakos Papadopoulos was sent off. Bayern's undefeated streak is up to 48 consecutive matches and have won their last 15 matches in the league. Bayern finished the matchday in first place. Bayern faced VfL Wolfsburg on matchday 24 on 8 March. Bayern won 6–1 and have won their last 16 league matches. Xherdan Shaqiri, Thomas Müller (2 goals), Mario Mandžukić (2 goals), and Franck Ribéry scored for Bayern and Naldo scored for Wolfsburg. Bayern scored five goals in a 17-minute period. Bayern finished the matchday in first place. Bayern faced Bayer Leverkusen on matchday 25 on 15 March. Bayern beat Bayer Leverkusen 2–1. Mario Mandžukić and Bastian Schweinsteiger scored for Bayern and Stefan Kießling scored for Bayer Leverkusen. The win mean Bayern's undefeated streak is at 50 consecutive match. Bayern finished the matchday in first place and has a 23-point lead over Borussia Dortmund. Bayern faced 1. FSV Mainz 05 on matchday 26 on 22 March. Bayern won 2–0 with goals from Bastian Schweinsteiger and Mario Götze. Bayern have scored at least two goals in their last 18 league matches, a league record. Bayern finished the matchday in first place. Bayern faced Hertha BSC on matchday 27 on 25 March. Bayern won the match 3–1. Toni Kroos, Mario Götze, and Franck Ribéry scored for Bayern. Adrián Ramos scored from a penalty kick for Hertha. Bayern won their 24th league championship. Bayern became the first club to clinch the Bundesliga championship in March and won the league with a "record seven games to spare." Bayern faced 1899 Hoffenheim on matchday 28 on 29 March. The match ended in a 3–3 draw. Claudio Pizzaro (2 goals) and Xherdan Shaqiri scored for Bayern and Anthony Modeste, Sejad Salihović, and Roberto Firmino scored for Hoffenheim. Hoffenheim ended Bayern's 19–match winning streak; but failed to end the 52–match undefeated streak. Thiago picked up an injury during the match and is out for two months.

April–May

Bayern started April with matchday 29 against FC Augsburg on 5 April. Augsburg won 1–0 with a goal from Sascha Mölders. Bayern lost for the first time in the league in 53 matches. Their last loss was against Bayer Leverkusen on 28 October 2012. This is the first victory against Bayern for FC Augsburg since the merger to form the club. The last time Augsburg won against Bayern was when BC Augsburg defeated them on 6 August 1961. Ylli Sallahi made his professional debut in the match. Xherdan Shaqiri picked up an injury during the match. Bayern faced Borussia Dortmund on matchday 30 on 12 April. Borussia Dortmund won 3–0 with goals from Henrikh Mkhitaryan, Marco Reus, and Jonas Hofmann. This is the first time that Bayern have lost two straight matches since November 2011. Rafinha was sent–off and eventually received a three–match ban. Manuel Neuer left the match with a calf injury. Bayern faced Eintracht Braunschweig on matchday 31 on 19 April. Bayern won 2–0 with goals from Claudio Pizzaro and Mario Mandžukić. This is Bayern's first victory in four matches. Bayern had only 14 first team players available for the match. Bayern faced Werder Bremen on matchday 32 on 26 April. Bayern won 5–2. Franck Ribéry, Claudio Pizarro (2 goals), Bastian Schweinsteiger, and Arjen Robben scored for Bayern. Theodor Gebre Selassie and Aaron Hunt scored for Werder Bremen. Bayern had a minute's silence before the match because of Tito Vilanova's death the day before.

Bayern faced Hamburger SV on 3 May. Bayern won the match 4–1. Mario Götze (2 goals), Thomas Müller and Claudio Pizzaro scored for Bayern and Hakan Çalhanoğlu scored for Hamburg. Jérôme Boateng was sent–off. Bayern faced VfB Stuttgart on matchday 34 on 10 May. Bayern won 1–0 with a goal from Claudio Pizzaro. Bastian Schweinsteiger picked up an injury during the match and was substituted in the first half.

Fixtures & results

Results by round

League table

Results summary

Records broken

* Ongoing record
Last updated: 12 April 2014

DFB–Pokal

DFB–Pokal review

The draw for the first round of the DFB-Pokal took place on 15 June and were drawn against Schwarz-Weiß Rehden. The match took place on 5 August. Bayern won 5–0. Bayern's goalscorers were Xherdan Shaqiri, Thomas Müller (3 goals), and Arjen Robben. Bayern were drawn against Hannover 96 in the second round draw for the DFB-Pokal on 10 August. The match took place on 25 September. Mario Götze was available to return to for the first time since his injury but he wasn't selected for the matchday roster. Bayern won 4–1 on goals from Thomas Müller (2 goals) Claudio Pizarro, and Franck Ribéry. Didier Ya Konan scored for Hannover. Bayern were drawn against FC Augsburg for the round of 16 on 29 September. on 4 December. Bayern won 2–0 with goals from Arjen Robben and Thomas Müller. Marwin Hitz fouled Arjen Robben with his studs. Robben received a "deep cut to the knee joint" on the play. No penalty shot was awarded because Arjen Robben was ruled offside prior to the incident. Thomas Müller came on for Arjen Robben in the 16th minute. Arjen Robben has been ruled out for six weeks because of the injury. Marwin Hitz eventually apologized to Arjen Robben for the tackle. There still was visible marks where the deep cut was during the mid–season training camp. The draw for the quarter–finals of the DFB-Pokal took place on 8 December. Bayern were drawn Hamburger SV. The match took place on 12 February. Bastian Schweinsteiger returned from injury. Bayern won 5–0 with goals from Mario Mandžukić (3 goals), Dante, and Arjen Robben. The draw for the semi–finals took place immediately after the quarter–finals was completed and were drawn against 1. FC Kaiserslautern. The match took place on 16 April. Bayern won the match 5–1. Bastian Schweinsteiger, Toni Kroos, Thomas Müller, Mario Mandžukić, and Mario Götze scored for Bayern. Simon Zoller scored for Kaiserslautern. Borussia Dortmund won the other semi–final and faced Bayern in the final. The match took place on 17 May. Bayern won the match 2–0 with goals from Robben and Müller. This was the first 0–0 match (after 90 minutes) since the 1992 cup final. This was Bayern's 10th league–and–cup double. Philipp Lahm picked up an injury during the match. There was a dispute over a header by Mats Hummels. In the 64th minute, the ball had crossed the line before Dante cleared the ball. No goal was given. However, Hummels hit the header from an offside position. Bayern were without Mandžukić and Schweinsteiger. Neither player traveled with the team on 15 May. Schweinsteiger was out injured. He had been questionable for the match. Guardiola stated that Mandžukić was fit, but had decided not to include him in the squad. Guardiola was questioned over the absence of Mandžukić, but remained "tight–lipped" about it. Thiago missed the final because he "suffered a setback in his rehabilitation." David Alaba was also injured for the final.

DFB–Pokal fixtures & results

UEFA Champions League

Review

Group stage

Bayern were in the draw for the Champions League Group Stage on 29 August. They were drawn into Group D along with CSKA Moscow, Manchester City, and Viktoria Plzeň. Bayern face CSKA Moscow in Champions League on 17 September. Bayern won 3–0 with goals from David Alaba, Mario Mandžukić, and Arjen Robben. Manchester City also won 3–0 and were tied with Bayern for first place in Group D. Bastian Schweinsteiger made a "brief comeback" against CSKA Moscow. Schweinsteiger reported to kicker that "he is not up to making a full return this weekend." Bayern faced Manchester City on 2 October,  winning 3–1. Franck Ribéry, Thomas Müller, and Arjen Robben scored for Bayern. Álvaro Negredo scored for Manchester City. Jérôme Boateng was sent–off late in the match. Bayern Munich finished matchday two in sole possession of first place in Group D. Bayern faced Viktoria Plzeň in Champions League on 23 October. Bayern won 5–0 with goals from Franck Ribéry, David Alaba, Bastian Schweinsteiger, and Mario Götze. Franck Ribéry scored two goals. Bastian Schweinsteiger's goal was the 6200 in the history of the Champions League. Bayern faced Viktoria Plzeň in Champions League on 5 November. Bayern won 1–0 with a goal from Mario Mandžukić. With the win, Bayern equaled Barcelona's record of nine consecutive wins in the competition. Bayern finished the matchday in first place. Bayern faced CSKA Moscow on 27 November. Bayern won 3–1. Arjen Robben, Mario Götze, and Thomas Müller scored for Bayern. Keisuke Honda scored from a penalty kick for CSKA Moscow. Julian Green made his first team debut in the match. The win means Bayern set a new record with 10 consecutive wins in Champions League. Bayern finished the matchday in first place. Bayern faced Manchester City on 10 December. Manchester City won 3–2. This was Bayern's first loss in 28 matches in all competitions. Thomas Müller and Mario Götze scored for Bayern. David Silva, Aleksandar Kolarov, and James Milner scored for Manchester City. The foul that led to the penalty kick was called "dubious" by kicker and a "controversial penalty" after "minimal contract" from Süddeutsche Zeitung. However, BBC stated that James Milner "won it" after being "tripped." Manchester City manager Manuel Pellegrini didn't realize that one more goal against Bayern would have put Manchester City ahead of Bayern.

Knockout phase

The draw for the 2013–14 knockout phase took place on 16 December. Bayern were drawn against Arsenal. The first leg took place on 19 February. Franck Ribéry and Xherdan Shaqiri were not available for the first leg. Bayern won 2–0 with goals from Toni Kroos and Thomas Müller. Yaya Sanogo was fouled by Jérôme Boateng in the seventh minute which led to Manuel Neuer saving a penalty shot from Mesut Özil. Arsenal goalkeeper Wojciech Szczęsny fouled Arjen Robben in the 37th minute. The foul led to a red card for Szczęsny and penalty shot. Arsenal reserve goalkeeper Łukasz Fabiański was substituted in for Santi Cazorla to replace Szczęsny in net. David Alaba took the penalty shot and hit the net. The second leg was played on 11 March. Bayern advanced to the quarter–finals after winning the tie 3–1 after the second leg ended in a 1–1 draw. Bastian Schweinsteiger gave Bayern the lead, however, Lukas Podolski equalized for Arsenal. Thomas Müller had a penalty shot saved in stoppage time in the second half. Arjen Robben drew the penalty that led to the penalty shot. Arsène Wenger stated that Robben was "a very good diver." Robben stated that Wenger shouldn't "start complaining about silly things" and believes that he drew two penalty shots. Mesut Özil touched the ball only 21 times and picked up a thigh injury during the second leg. Schweinsteiger's goal means that Bayern's 2–0 loss last season to Arsenal is the only match in their last 100 matches where they failed to score in a match. Arsenal had one less player on the bench due to a "red tape" situation. Arsenal brought Ryo Miyaichi to Allianz Arena for the second leg. However, Arsenal wanted to loan him out and took him off the UEFA roster list. UEFA told Arsenal on the matchday that he wasn't eligible to play. Dante was suspended for the match.

The draw for the quarter–finals took place on 21 March. The result was Bayern would face Manchester United. The first leg took place on 1 April. The match ended in a 1–1 draw. Bastian Schweinsteiger scored for Bayern and Nemanja Vidić scored for Manchester United. Bastian Schweinsteiger and Javi Martínez are suspended after Schweinsteiger picked up two yellow cards and the subsequent red card and Martínez picked up his third yellow card. There is some question over the sending–off of Schweinsteiger. Die Welt questioned whether it was a sending–off. The next day, Die Welt stated that Schweinsteiger "had indeed taken at his opponent Rooney, but also clearly played the ball." Pep Guardiola disagreed with the call stated that it was "unfair". Guardiola had used a hand gesture that Wayne Rooney had dive. David Moyes stated how he thought Schweinsteiger "trips Wayne up" and also stated that "It's a booking or at least a foul." The English press also favoured Rooney. Rooney denied diving the following day. The second leg was played on 9 April. Bayern won the match 3–1 and 4–2 on aggregate. Mario Mandžukić, Thomas Müller, and Arjen Robben scored for Bayern and Patrice Evra scored for Manchester United. Evra gave Manchester United the lead in the 57th minute with Bayern equalizing 69 seconds later with a goal from Mandžukić. In addition to missing Schweinsteiger and Martínez, Bayern was without Xherdan Shaqiri. Shaqiri picked up an injury against FC Augsburg. Wayne Rooney picked up a toe injury from the first leg of the tie and was rated as doubtful for the second leg. However, David Moyes stated that he would be "mad" not to play Rooney and started him. Rooney had taken an injection prior to the match.

The draw for the semi–final took place on 11 April. Bayern were drawn against Real Madrid. The first leg took place on 23 April. Real Madrid won 1–0 with a goal from Karim Benzema. Bayern had 15 corners and 705 passes compared to Real Madrid's three corners and 276 passes. Real Madrid had 20% possession in the first half and 37% in the second half. Pep Guardiola lost his first match at the Santiago Bernabéu Stadium. He was undefeated in his seven previous matches at the stadium. Guardiola was criticized for his tactics in the match. However, Guardiola defended his tactics. Arjen Robben stated that he "expected more" from Real Madrid. The return leg took place on 29 April. Real Madrid won the second leg 4–0 with two goals from Sergio Ramos and two goals from Cristiano Ronaldo. Ronaldo's goals set a new single–season record. His goals brought him to 16 goals in the current Champions League season. Lionel Messi had the previous record with 14 goals during the 2011–12 season. Real Madrid advanced to the Champions League final with a 5–0 aggregate win. This is the first time Real Madrid had won in Munich. They had nine losses and a draw prior to the win. Xabi Alonso picked up a yellow card in the match and is suspended for the final. Guardiola took the blame for the loss. However, Philipp Lahm insisted "it was a collective failure and not the fault of coach Guardiola."

Fixtures & results

Group stage

Group D results

Group D table

Knockout phase

Round of 16

Quarter-finals

Semi-finals

Other competitions

Review of other competitions

Bayern played in the DFL-Supercup against Borussia Dortmund on 27 July but lost the match 4–2. Marco Reus scored two goals for Borussia Dortmund. İlkay Gündoğan also scored for Dortmund. Daniel Van Buyten scored an own goal to put Dortmund up 2–1. Arjen Robben scored two goals for Bayern. Bayern also played UEFA Super Cup on 30 August against Chelsea. Bastian Schweinsteiger missed the UEFA Super Cup due to the injury. Tactics were "established early on: Bayern were patient and progressive with Chelsea content to defend deep and break swiftly." Fernando Torres gave Chelsea the lead in the eighth minute. Franck Ribéry equalized the score at 1–1. The match went into extra time. Chelsea "stormed" forward early in extra time and Eden Hazard scored in the 93rd minute to put Chelsea up 2–1. Bayern played from then on a "power play like hockey." Javi Martínez equalized one minute and 50 seconds into stoppage time in the second extra time period. The match went to a shoot–out which Bayern won 5–4. Romelu Lukaku failed to score on the last shot of the shoot–out. Javi Martínez, Mario Götze, and Arjen Robben picked up injuries during the match. Bayern also participated in the FIFA Club World Cup. Bayern were drawn against the winner of the match between the Asian Champions League champions and the African Champions League champions. Guangzhou Evergrande won the Asian Champions League and Al Ahly won the African Champions League. Guangzhou Evergrande advanced to the semi–final against Bayern on 17 December. Bayern won 3–0 with goals from Franck Ribéry, Mario Mandžukić, and Mario Götze. Bayern went on to play in the final of the FIFA Club World Cup against Raja Casablanca on 21 December. Bayern won 2–0 with goals from Dante and Thiago. This was the third time that Bayern won the World Championship. The first time was in 1976 and the second time was in 2001. The players left for a winter break after the match.

Results of other competitions

Other events

Javi Martínez came back from international duty in August with a groin injury.
Bastian Schweinsteiger returned to training on 11 September. He was injured in the match against SC Freiburg.
Xherdan Shaqiri picked up an injury during international duty with Switzerland. It was initially expected that he would miss two weeks. But he has since been ruled out until December.
Philipp Lahm, Thomas Müller, Manuel Neuer, Franck Ribéry, Arjen Robben, and Bastian Schweinsteiger are on the 23–player shortlist for the 2013 FIFA Ballon d'Or. Jupp Heynckes is up for the FIFA World Coach of the Year.
It was determined that Bastian Schweinsteiger requires further surgery and is out for an indefinite period. He had surgery in June. He returned to training on 6 February and played in his first match back against Hamburger SV on 12 February in the DFB-Pokal.
On 24 November, it was reported that Pep Guardiola "threatened" in a meeting with the team with "the expulsion of a potential mole" prior to the match against Borussia Dortmund. Bayern CEO Karl-Heinz Rummenigge stated that "The Bayern Munich 'mole' could be sold once tracked down."
After two ACL injuries and four surgeries, Holger Badstuber finished his rehab stint in a rehab centre in Donaustauf and started rehab at Bayern's training centre. Holger Badstuber originally injured his ACL in a match against Borussia Dortmund on 1 December 2012 and then reinjured his ACL five months later. Holger Badstuber returned to first–team training on 9 February.
During the winter break, Jan Kirchhoff joined Schalke 04 on loan to the end of next season.
Bayern had a mid–season training camp in Doha, Qatar from 5 to 14 January.
Franck Ribéry finished third in the 2013 FIFA Ballon d'Or voting.
Bayern played in a friendly match against Red Bull Salzburg on 18 January; six days before they returned to competitive action. Bayern lost 3–0.
On 6 February, Franck Ribéry had an operation. Ribéry "received a blow on the buttocks."

Team record

Player information

Squad statistics

Squad, appearances and goals

Clean sheets

Multi–goal matches

Discipline

Bookings

Suspensions

Reserve team

Erik ten Hag took over as coach of Bayern Munich II, who were in the fourth-tier Regionalliga Bayern. The team began the season with eight consecutive victories. and won their division, but lost the promotion playoff to Fortuna Köln on away goals after a 2–2 draw.

Squad

Source

Notes
1.Kickoff time in Central European Time/Central European Summer Time.
2.Bayern Munich goals listed first.
3.Bayern won 5–4 in a shoot–out.
4.Players who left on or after 27 July.
5.The competition was only one match and the starting line–up was Tom Starke, Philipp Lahm, Daniel Van Buyten, Jérôme Boateng, David Alaba, Thiago, Thomas Müller, Toni Kroos, Arjen Robben, Mario Mandžukić, and Xherdan Shaqiri.  Dante, Claudio Pizarro, and Bastian Schweinsteiger were substitutes for this match.
6.The competition was only one match and the starting line–up was Manuel Neuer, Dante, Rafinha, Jérôme Boateng, Philipp Lahm, Thomas Müller, David Alaba, Toni Kroos, Mario Mandžukić, and Arjen Robben.  The substitutes were Mario Götze, Javi Martinez, and Xherdan Shaqiri.
7.The competition included two matches. The following players appeared in both matches: Manuel Neuer, Rafinha, Jérôme Boateng, Philipp Lahm, David Alaba, Thiago, Franck Ribéry, Javi Martínez, Xherdan Shaqiri, Mario Götze, Toni Kroos & Mario Mandžukić.
8.The competition included two matches. The following players started both matches: Manuel Neuer, Rafinha, Jérôme Boateng, Philipp Lahm, David Alaba, Thiago, Franck Ribéry, & Toni Kroos.

References

FC Bayern Munich seasons
Bayern Munich
Bayern Munich
German football championship-winning seasons
FIFA Club World Cup-winning seasons